Fjerdingby is the municipal centre in Rælingen municipality Akershus, Norway.

Villages in Akershus